West Career and Technical Academy (WCTA, West Tech) is a magnet high school located in Las Vegas, Nevada, United States. The school opened in August 2010 as the first magnet school in Summerlin, a community in the western Las Vegas Valley. It is administered by the Clark County School District. As of 2019, the school had an enrollment of 1,397 students and 61 classroom teachers on a FTE basis, for a student-teacher ratio of 23:1. West Tech offers nine programs to prepare students for a career in the field selected.

History 
After one and a half years of construction costing $83.5 million, West Tech opened to students on August 30, 2010. It is the last high school built under a 1998 bond program to revitalize schools in the Clark County School District (CCSD), which involved the construction, replacement, and rehabilitation of more than 100 schools. For its first year of operation, West Tech admitted 750 freshmen and sophomores.

In December 2014, student Angelique Clark applied to begin a pro-life club at the school; however, the administration denied her application, claiming the subject was too controversial. She proceeded to send two demand letters to CCSD, but when she failed to receive a response, she sued West Tech in August 2015. The following month, the school agreed to the formation of the club.

Facilities 

The buildings of the school occupy .

A rotating solar panel and a ground heat source exchange system help to power the campus. There is also a computerized weather station and four greenhouses, which are used to facilitate students' learning in horticulture, biotechnology, and other fields. West Tech also includes multiple computer labs and a student WiFi system.

Academics 
West Tech offers the following nine programs: .

 Biomedical Sciences: prepares students with the knowledge and skills in disease exploration, human body systems, and biomedical engineering. Areas of study include infectious and genetic diseases, molecular biology, oncology, metabolism, homeostasis, and exercise physiology.
 Biotechnology: explores molecular biology and genetics through industry-standard equipment. Areas of exploration include applied biomedical engineering, molecular biology, pathogen defense, infectious diseases, genetic diseases and preventing, detecting, and treating cancer. Topics of investigation include biomedical problems, community health, and the roles and responsibilities of various biomedical professions.
 Business Management: prepares students with the overall principles of business management. Areas of study include economics, budgeting, human resource management, operations, strategic management and financial-based decision making. Students will learn how to file taxes and have opportunities for certification.
 Cybersecurity: prepares students with knowledge and skills in computer maintenance and repair, the cybersecurity life cycle, incident handling and networking. Successful students will be prepared to take certification exams for CompTIA’s A+ and Networking +, which are required baseline certifications for careers in IT and Cybersecurity.
 Digital Media: introduces students to the principles of creating graphic works. Areas of study include elements and principles of design, production aspects, legal and ethical issues, and portfolio development. The Digital Media program breaks into graphic design and either photography, video production/broadcast, or animation subgroups, also known as strands.
 Engineering: discusses architecture and civil engineering through areas of study including safety, construction documentation, the engineering design process, and the impacts of engineering on society. Students will explore robotic systems, determine its components, and construct a robotic system for automation.
 Environmental Science: prepares students with the information and skills necessary for success in environmental management. Areas of study include ecology, environmental quality, sustainable use, GIS and GPS, energy, hydrology and hydrogeology, law and public policy, and environmental site analysis.
 Nursing: provides students with the knowledge and skills required for entry into the healthcare field. Students who complete the didactic and clinical practicum have the opportunity to become licensed as a Certified Nursing Assistant.
 Sports Medicine: prepares students with an introduction to sports medicine techniques and processes. The program provides the primary skills and knowledge in athletic training, and sports medicine related fields. The areas of study include physical fitness, human anatomy and physiology, injury evaluation and prevention, and rehabilitation.

Students select one of these programs to study throughout high school, designed to assist them in future studies and a career in the field. A student must be enrolled in West Tech by their sophomore year  so that all required classes for their program can be completed in a timely manner; for this reason a student may not change their chosen program after sophomore year.

West Tech utilizes the Google Apps for Education, which grant each student a free e-mail account, access to Google Sites, and other services.

Clubs and activities 
The school offers several career and technical student organizations (CTSOs), including DECA, FBLA, Skills USA, FFA, and HOSA. There are no NIAA sports teams. The school also offers two honors societies, including NHS and Mu Alpha Theta.

Some students choose to start their own clubs with the assistance of faculty and classmates, including clubs like Mock Trial and Speech and Debate.

Project-Based Learning 
West Tech incorporates one school-wide project-based learning (PBL) event per semester which lasts two days. Topics for the PBL vary, including exploring different cultures, researching new technologies, and improving school spirit.

Notable faculty
 Yvonne Caples  Former Computer Based Projects teacher
Monte Bay  Original principal (2010-2012)
 Brian Boyars  Current Chemistry Teacher known for carrying a lightsaber around campus if a student dares to cheat on a lab report. Is rumored to teach from a dungeon.

Notable alumni 

 Pedro: Known for Pedro in the quad the hit KCOW morning announcements show. (Note: The show was alright, could have been better. 5/10 stars.) Pedro was also known for yelling F*** in a school assembly. Gg

References

External links 

 School website
 Clark County School District website

High schools in Clark County, Nevada
Educational institutions established in 2010
Public high schools in Nevada
Magnet schools in Nevada
Buildings and structures in Summerlin, Nevada
2010 establishments in Nevada